Tachina corsicana is a species of fly in the genus Tachina of the family Tachinidae that can be found in Bulgaria, Greece, and the islands of Corsica and Sardinia.

References

Insects described in 1931
Diptera of Europe
corsicana